Paul Morrish is an Australian rules footballer who played for Richmond, Essendon and Fitzroy. He made his debut with Richmond against Geelong in round 22 of 1986 season and played three more games for Richmond in 1989. Morrish was drafted by Essendon in 1990 Midyear draft and played 7 games in the 1991 season. In the 1991 AFL draft he was picked up by Fitzroy and played 20 games for them in 1992 and 1993.

External links

1968 births
Living people
Essendon Football Club players
Fitzroy Football Club players
Richmond Football Club players
Australian rules footballers from Victoria (Australia)